The Democratic Movement for the Liberation of the Eritrean Kunama (abbreviated DMLEK) is a Kunama rebel group active in Eritrea. The group is mainly funded by Eritrean diaspora and is allied with the Red Sea Afar Democratic Organisation.

References

Guerrilla organizations
National liberation movements in Africa
Rebel groups in Eritrea
Rebel groups in Ethiopia